The Serbia women's national volleyball team is governed by the Volleyball Federation of Serbia and takes part in international volleyball competitions.

FIVB considers Serbia the inheritor of the records of SFR Yugoslavia (1948–1992) and Serbia and Montenegro (1992–2006). The Olympic Committee of Serbia declared the women's national volleyball team the best female side of the year from 2006 to 2011.

Serbia earned a silver medal at the 2016 summer Olympics, a bronze medal at the 2020 summer Olympics, won back to back the FIVB World Championship in 2018 and 2022.

Results

Olympic Games

World Championship

European Championship

World Cup

World Grand Prix

Nations League

European Games

European Volleyball League

Team

Current squad
The following is the Serbian roster in the 2022 World Championship.

Head coach: Daniele Santarelli

Notable squads

Previous squads
 2003 European Championship — 9th place
Sanja Starović, Svetlana Ilić, Maja Ilić, Aleksandra Ranković, Ivana Đerisilo, Vesna Tomašević, Anja Spasojević, Jelena Nikolić, Aleksandra Milosavljević, Maja Simanić, Mira Golubović, Ivana Krdžić. Head Coach: Zoran Terzić.
 2005 European Championship — 7th place
Sanja Starović, Marina Vujović, Vesna Čitaković, Aleksandra Ranković, Ivana Đerisilo, Brižitka Molnar, Anja Spasojević, Jelena Nikolić, Maja Ognjenović, Maja Simanić, Nataša Krsmanović, Aleksandra Avramović. Head Coach: Zoran Terzić.

 2006 World Championship — 3rd place
Jelena Nikolić, Aleksandra Ranković, Ivana Đerisilo, Nataša Krsmanović, Jovana Brakočević, Brižitka Molnar, Jovana Vesović, Maja Ognjenović, Vesna Čitaković, Maja Simanić, Anja Spasojević, Suzana Ćebić. Head Coach: Zoran Terzić.
 2007 European Championship — 2nd place
Jelena Nikolić, Jasna Majstorović, Nataša Krsmanović, Jovana Brakočević, Brižitka Molnar, Jovana Vesović, Maja Ognjenović, Vesna Čitaković, Ivana Isailović, Maja Simanić, Anja Spasojević, Suzana Ćebić. Head Coach: Zoran Terzić.
 2008 Olympics — 5th place
Jovana Brakočević, Suzana Ćebić, Vesna Čitaković, Nataša Krsmanović, Ivana Đerisilo, Brižitka Molnar, Sanja Malagurski, Jelena Nikolić, Maja Ognjenović, Maja Simanić, Stefana Veljković, Jovana Vesović. Head Coach: Zoran Terzić.
 2009 European Championship — 7th place
Jelena Nikolić, Jovana Brakočević, Ivana Đerisilo, Nataša Krsmanović, Jasna Majstorović, Brižitka Molnar, Ana Antonijević, Jovana Vesović, Maja Ognjenović, Stefana Veljković, Milena Rašić, Aleksandra Petrović, Silvija Popović, Suzana Ćebić. Head Coach: Zoran Terzić.
 2010 World Championship — 8th place
Jelena Nikolić, Jovana Brakočević, Sanja Malagurski, Nataša Krsmanović, Jasna Majstorović, Brižitka Molnar, Ana Antonijević, Jovana Vesović, Maja Ognjenović, Stefana Veljković, Milena Rašić, Silvija Popović, Suzana Ćebić, Dragana Marinković. Head Coach: Zoran Terzić.
 2011 FIVB Volleyball World Grand Prix — 3rd place
Ana Lazarević, Jovana Brakočević, Sanja Malagurski, Nataša Krsmanović, Tijana Malešević, Brižitka Molnar, Ana Antonijević, Jovana Vesović, Maja Ognjenović, Jelena Nikolić, Nađa Ninković, Milena Rašić, Suzana Ćebić, Silvija Popović. Head Coach: Zoran Terzić.
 2011 European Championship — 1st place
Ana Lazarević, Jovana Brakočević, Sanja Malagurski, Nataša Krsmanović, Tijana Malešević, Brižitka Molnar, Ana Antonijević, Jovana Vesović, Maja Ognjenović, Jelena Nikolić, Nađa Ninković, Milena Rašić, Suzana Ćebić, Silvija Popović. Head Coach: Zoran Terzić.
 2012 Olympics — 11th place
Jovana Brakočević, Ivana Đerisilo, Bojana Živković, Nataša Krsmanović, Brankica Mihajlović, Jovana Vesović, Maja Ognjenović, Stefana Veljković, Milena Rašić, Suzana Ćebić, Sanja Starović, Jelena Blagojević. Head Coach: Zoran Terzić.
 2013 FIVB Volleyball World Grand Prix — 3rd place
Jovana Brakočević, Bojana Živković, Nataša Krsmanović, Tijana Malešević, Brižitka Molnar, Brankica Mihajlović, Maja Ognjenović, Stefana Veljković, Jelena Nikolić, Ana Bjelica, Nađa Ninković, Milena Rašić, Suzana Ćebić, Jasna Majstorović. Head Coach: Zoran Terzić.
 2013 European Championship — 4th place
Jovana Brakočević, Sanja Malagurski, Bojana Živković, Nataša Krsmanović, Tijana Malešević, Brižitka Molnar, Brankica Mihajlović, Maja Ognjenović, Stefana Veljković, Jelena Nikolić, Ana Bjelica, Milena Rašić, Suzana Ćebić, Jasna Majstorović. Head Coach: Zoran Terzić.
 2014 World Championship — 7th place
Jovana Brakočević, Bojana Živković, Nataša Krsmanović, Tijana Malešević, Brižitka Molnar, Brankica Mihajlović, Maja Ognjenović, Stefana Veljković, Jelena Nikolić, Nađa Ninković, Milena Rašić, Silvija Popović, Suzana Ćebić, Tijana Bošković. Head Coach: Zoran Terzić.
 2015 FIVB Volleyball Women's World Cup — 2nd place
Bianka Buša, Bojana Živković, Mina Popović, Tijana Malešević, Brankica Mihajlović, Maja Ognjenović, Stefana Veljković, Jelena Nikolić, Ana Bjelica, Jovana Stevanović, Milena Rašić, Silvija Popović, Suzana Ćebić, Tijana Bošković. Head Coach: Zoran Terzić.
 2015 European Championship — 3rd place
Bianka Buša, Bojana Živković, Mina Popović, Tijana Malešević, Brankica Mihajlović, Maja Ognjenović, Stefana Veljković, Jelena Nikolić, Ana Bjelica, Jovana Stevanović, Milena Rašić, Silvija Popović, Suzana Ćebić, Tijana Bošković. Head Coach: Zoran Terzić.
 2016 Olympics — 2nd place
Bianka Buša, Jovana Brakočević, Bojana Živković, Tijana Malešević, Brankica Mihajlović, Maja Ognjenović, Stefana Veljković, Jelena Nikolić, Jovana Stevanović, Milena Rašić, Silvija Popović, Tijana Bošković. Head Coach: Zoran Terzić.
 2017 FIVB Volleyball World Grand Prix — 3rd place
Bianka Buša, Sanja Malagurski, Bojana Živković, Tijana Malešević, Ana Antonijević, Brankica Mihajlović, Stefana Veljković, Teodora Pušić, Ana Bjelica, Jovana Stevanović, Milena Rašić, Tijana Bošković, Bojana Milenković, Jelena Blagojević. Head Coach: Zoran Terzić.
 2017 European Championship — 1st place
Bianka Buša, Bojana Živković, Mina Popović, Tijana Malešević, Brankica Mihajlović, Slađana Mirković, Stefana Veljković, Teodora Pušić, Ana Bjelica, Jovana Stevanović, Milena Rašić, Tijana Bošković, Bojana Milenković, Jelena Blagojević. Head Coach: Zoran Terzić.
 2018 World Championship — 1st place
 Bianka Buša, Bojana Živković, Tijana Malešević, Brankica Mihajlović, Maja Ognjenović, Stefana Veljković, Teodora Pušić, Ana Bjelica, Maja Aleksić, Jovana Stevanović, Milena Rašić, Silvija Popović, Tijana Bošković, Bojana Milenković. Head Coach: Zoran Terzić.
 2019 European Championship — 1st place
 Bianka Buša, Katarina Lazović, Mina Popović, Slađana Mirković, Brankica Mihajlović, Maja Ognjenović, Stefana Veljković, Teodora Pušić, Ana Bjelica, Maja Aleksić, Silvija Popović, Tijana Bošković, Bojana Milenković, Jelena Blagojević. Head Coach: Zoran Terzić.
 2020 Olympics — 3rd place
 Bianka Buša, Mina Popović, Slađana Mirković, Brankica Mihajlović, Maja Ognjenović, Ana Bjelica, Maja Aleksić, Milena Rašić, Silvija Popović, Tijana Bošković, Bojana Milenković, Jelena Blagojević. Head Coach: Zoran Terzić.
 2021 European Championship — 2nd place
 Bianka Buša, Katarina Lazović, Sara Carić, Mina Popović, Slađana Mirković, Maja Ognjenović, Stefana Veljković, Ana Bjelica, Milena Rašić, Silvija Popović, Tijana Bošković, Bojana Milenković, Jelena Blagojević, Jovana Kocić. Head Coach: Zoran Terzić.
 2022 FIVB Volleyball Women's Nations League — 3rd place
 Bianka Buša, Katarina Lazović, Bojana Drča, Mina Popović, Slađana Mirković, Brankica Mihajlović, Teodora Pušić, Ana Bjelica, Maja Aleksić, Jovana Stevanović, Bojana Milenković, Sara Lozo, Jovana Kocić, Sanja Djurdjević. Head Coach: Daniele Santarelli
 2022 World Championship — 1st place
 Bianka Buša, Katarina Lazović, Bojana Drča, Mina Popović, Slađana Mirković, Brankica Mihajlović, Teodora Pušić, Ana Bjelica, Maja Aleksić, Jovana Stevanović, Aleksandra Jegdić, Tijana Bošković, Bojana Milenković, Sara Lozo. Head Coach: Daniele Santarelli

Coaches

Kit providers
The table below shows the history of kit providers for the Serbia national volleyball team.

Sponsorship
One of the main sponsors is Poštanska štedionica.

See also
Serbia men's national volleyball team
Yugoslavia women's national volleyball team
Yugoslavia men's national volleyball team

References

External links
Official website
FIVB profile

 
National women's volleyball teams